"Leave the Club" is a song by American rapper Don Toliver featuring fellow American rappers Lil Durk and GloRilla. Written alongside producers Oz, Dez Wright, Hitkidd, Mu Lean, & James Blake, it was released on February 17, 2023, as the third single from Toliver's third studio album Love Sick (2023).

Composition
The song features a "spacey, trap-centric" beat and is split into two parts, the first of which lyrically finds Don Toliver requesting a woman to "bust it open" for him and wanting to leave the club with her as he would rather spend the night at home, which he tries to convince her. Meanwhile, Lil Durk is also at the club when his partner remotely tells him to come home; although he is interested in a few women at the club, he leaves via Uber. During the transition to the second part, the beat changes to a more "downtempo, menacing canvas", over which GloRilla raps in a "gritty" flow, taking on the role of the woman telling the man to leave the club.

Visualizer
The single was released with an accompanying visualizer which draws inspiration from culture in the 1970s and disco.

Charts

References

2023 singles
2023 songs
Don Toliver songs
Lil Durk songs
GloRilla songs
Cactus Jack Records singles
Atlantic Records singles
Songs written by Don Toliver
Songs written by Lil Durk
Songs written by GloRilla
Songs written by Oz (record producer)
Songs written by James Blake (musician)